James Walker (born October 1957) is a former American hurdler. Born in Atlanta, Georgia, he attended Auburn University from 1976-1980.  Walker was one of "The Fabulous Four" along with teammates Harvey Glance, Willie Smith, and Tony Easley; together they set more school and conference records than any other foursome in the history of the Southeastern Conference. Walker qualified for the 1980 U.S. Olympic team but did not compete due to the 1980 Summer Olympics boycott. He did however receive one of 461 Congressional Gold Medals created especially for the spurned athletes.

James Walker lives in Madison, Alabama.

Achievements
 Won the gold medal at the Pan American Games in 1979 in the 400 metre hurdles
 SEC's Track & Field Athlete of the Year in 1979
 Until 2005, held the SEC record for the 400 meter hurdles with a time of 48.48 secs in 1979
 In 1977, 1978, 1979 had the best time in the SEC for the 400 meter hurdles (49.58, 51.51, 48.48)
 NCAA Division I champion, 400 meter hurdles, 1978 and 1979
 In 1976, had the best time in the SEC for the 120 yard hurdles (13.7 secs).
 In 1977, 1978, 1979 had the best time for the 110 meter hurdles (13.90, 14.0, 13.70 secs).
 In 1978, was the U.S. Outdoor Track and Field champion in the 400 metre hurdles with a time of 49.03 seconds.

References

Living people
1958 births
American male hurdlers
Athletes (track and field) at the 1979 Pan American Games
Auburn Tigers men's track and field athletes
Pan American Games gold medalists for the United States
Pan American Games medalists in athletics (track and field)
Universiade medalists in athletics (track and field)
Congressional Gold Medal recipients
Track and field athletes from Atlanta
Universiade bronze medalists for the United States
Medalists at the 1979 Pan American Games